The 1986–87 All-Ireland Senior Club Football Championship was the 17th staging of the All-Ireland Senior Club Football Championship since its establishment by the Gaelic Athletic Association in 1970-71.

St. Mary's Burren were the defending champions, however, they were beaten by Castleblayney Faughs in the Ulster Club Championship.

On 17 March 1987, St. Finbarr's won the championship following a 0–10 to 0–07 defeat of Clann na nGael in the All-Ireland final at Croke Park. It was their third championship title overall and their first title since 1981.

Results

Munster Senior Club Football Championship

First round

Semi-finals

Final

All-Ireland Senior Club Football Championship

Quarter-final

Semi-finals

Final

Championship statistics

Miscellaneous

 Clann na nGael became the first team to win three successive Connacht Club Championship titles.
 Ferbane won the Leinster Club Championship for the first time in their history.
 Castleblayney Faughs won the Ulster Club Championship for the first time in their history.

References

1986 in Gaelic football
1987 in Gaelic football